Yang Gang may refer to:
 Yang Gang (journalist) (1905–1957), Chinese journalist
 Yang Gang (politician) (born 1953), Chinese politician
 Yang Gang, art director for the film Red Sorghum (film)
 Yang Gang, character in Painted Skin (TV series)
 Yang Gang or #YangGang, supporters of Andrew Yang and his 2020 presidential campaign
 Yanggang Province or Ryanggang Province, a province in North Korea

See also
Yang Guang (disambiguation)